Spinasse (sometimes Cascina Spinasse) is an Italian restaurant in Seattle, Washington, established in 2008.

Description 
Spinasse is an Italian restaurant in Seattle's Capitol Hill neighborhood. The restaurant's menu focuses on cuisine from Piedmont, Italy. Menu options have included arugula salad, apple and quince crostata, lasagna, braised lamb, mascarpone cheesecake, and torta pasqualina. The dessert menu has included grilled peach with oatmeal gelato and cinnamon milk.

History 
Chef Stuart Lane replaced Jason Stratton in 2015.

Reception 
Seattle Metropolitan included the business in a 2022 list of "The Best Italian Food in Seattle". Jade Yamazaki Stewart included Spinasse in Eater Seattle's 2022 lists of "12 Seattle Area Restaurants Perfect for a Romantic Night Out" and "20 Date-Worthy Seattle Restaurants Actually Open on Mondays". Gabe Guarente, Mark Van Streefkerk, and Stewart also included the restaurant in a 2022 list of "25 Essential Capitol Hill Restaurants". Aimee Rizzo included Spinasse in The Infatuation's 2023 overview of Seattle's 25 best restaurants.

See also 

 List of Italian restaurants

References

External links

 

2008 establishments in Washington (state)
Capitol Hill, Seattle
Italian restaurants in Seattle
Restaurants established in 2008